Local elections were held in Turkey on 26 March 1989. In the elections, both the mayors and the local parliaments were elected. The figures presented below are the results of the local parliament elections.

Results
In the elections, the ANAP suffered a nationwide rout in what many saw as a referendum on the Özal administration.

Provincial assemblies

Metropolitan center mayors

Mayor of other centers

References

Local elections in Turkey
Local